Dilambdogale is an extinct genus of afrosoricid which existed in Fayum, Egypt during the latest Eocene (earliest Priabonian age). It was first named by Erik R. Seiffert in 2010 and the type species is Dilambdogale gheerbranti. Dilambdogale is the oldest known afrosoricid and its closest relative was Widanelfarasia.

Cladogram based on Seiffert (2010):

References

Prehistoric eutherians
Fossil taxa described in 2010
Eocene mammals
Eocene mammals of Africa
Prehistoric placental genera